Baz Muhammad Khan (Urdu: باز محمد خان) is a Pakistani politician and member of Senate of Pakistan, currently serving as Chairperson of the Senate Committee on Kashmir Affairs & Gilgit Baltistan. Additionally, Baz Muhammad Khan has been elected Chairman of Overseas Pakistanis Affairs.

Political career
He belongs to Bannu Khyber Pakhtunkhwa province of Pakistan, and was elected to the Senate of Pakistan in March 2012 on a general seat as Awami National Party candidate. He is the chairperson of Senate Committee on Kashmir Affairs & Gilgit Baltistan and Human Resources Development & Overseas Pakistanis. He is a member of senate committees of Cabinet Secretariat, Functional Committee on Government Assurances, Religious Affairs and Interfaith Harmony. He is the senior vice president of ANP Khyber Pakhtunkhwa since 2006 and is currently the Central Vice President of ANP. He has been previously elected to Khyber Pakhtunkhwa Assembly in 1988,1990, 1993, 1997 and again in 2002 where he served as provincial minister for health, provincial minister for forest and later provincial minister for irrigation. In 2008, Asfandyar Wali Khan had declared Baz Muhammad Khan as his party’s candidate for the Chief Minister’s slot, but Baz Muhammad Khan lost his seat. In 2013 his son Taimoor Baz Khan also contested elections from PK-71 and was declared the winner, but he lost his seat in repolling ordered by Chief Justice Dost Mohammad Khan who had issues with ANP in the past.

See also
 List of Senators of Pakistan
 List of committees of the Senate of Pakistan

References

External links
Senate of Pakistan Official Website
Awami National Party Official Website

Living people
Pakistani senators (14th Parliament)
Awami National Party politicians
Year of birth missing (living people)